Sandalee Glacier is in North Cascades National Park and Lake Chelan National Recreation Area in the U.S. state of Washington, on the north and east slopes of McGregor Mountain. In 1993, the Sandalee Glacier had an area of .2 km2. The National Park Service is currently studying Sandalee Glacier as part of their glacier monitoring project. Between 1993 (when monitoring began) and 2013 the glacier lost ~6 m of thickness.

See also
List of glaciers in the United States

References

Glaciers of the North Cascades
Cirques of the United States
Glaciers of Chelan County, Washington
Glaciers of Washington (state)